Oxypiloidea congica is a species of praying mantis in the family Hymenopodidae. It is native to central Africa.

See also
List of mantis genera and species

References

Cong
Mantodea of Africa
Insects of the Democratic Republic of the Congo
Insects of the Republic of the Congo